Sondha, also spelled as Sandha, is a village in Nalbari district, Assam, India. As per the  2011 Census of India, Sondha has a population of 3,428 people with literacy rate of 76.95%.

Sondha is also known for fish farming.

History 
In 1894, people gathered and held a Raijmel (public convention) at Sondha to protest against the British. During the Assam Movement, the Sondha unit of AASU was formed.

Schools in Sondha 
There are total 6 government high schools in Sondha. Those are:

 Kharbandha Vidyapith High School
 Rajkadamtal Sondha High School
 Rajkadamtal Balika Vidyalaya
 Sondha Moheswari Sanskrit Tol

Other government schools in Sondha as per Sarva Shiksha Abhiyan of Government of India are:
 165/1 No Sondha LPS
 165/2 No Sondha A.R. Pathsala
 Dakhin Sondha Milan LPS
 Kharbandha Vidyapith (ME)s
 Subha Priya LPS
 Sondha Maheswar Chatuspathi
 Manav Shakti Jatiya Vidyalaya

References 

Villages in Nalbari district